P99 may refer to:
 Embraer P-99, a Brazilian maritime patrol aircraft
 Ferguson P99, a Formula One racing car
 , a patrol boat of the Royal Australian Navy
 , a submarine of the Royal Navy
 Papyrus 99, a biblical manuscript
 Walther P99, a pistol
 P99, a NIOSH air filtration rating
 P99, a state regional road in Latvia
 P99, a terminal introduced in 1976 by Northgate Information Solutions